Pseudohemiodon is a genus of armored catfishes native to South America.

Species
There are currently seven recognized species in this genus:
 Pseudohemiodon amazonus (Delsman, 1941)
 Pseudohemiodon apithanos Isbrücker & Nijssen, 1978
 Pseudohemiodon devincenzii (Señorans, 1950)
 Pseudohemiodon laminus (Günther, 1868)
 Pseudohemiodon laticeps (Regan, 1904)
 Pseudohemiodon platycephalus (Kner, 1853)
 Pseudohemiodon thorectes Isbrücker, 1975

Distribution
Pseudohemiodon is distributed in the Amazon, Orinoco, and Paraná River basins.

Description
The body of Pseudohemiodon species is very flat and the pelvic fins are used mainly for locomotion on sand. Sexual dimorphism is unknown.

Ecology
Like other members of the Pseudohemiodon group, Pseudohemiodon occurs primarily over sandy substrates. Also like the other genera in the Pseudohemiodon group, species of this genus are abdomino-lip brooders. The very large eggs are incubated by the male.

References

Loricariini
Fish of South America
Fish of the Amazon basin
Fish of Bolivia
Freshwater fish of Brazil
Fish of Ecuador
Fish of Peru
Catfish genera
Taxa named by Pieter Bleeker
Freshwater fish genera